Gregory Benage is a game designer who has worked primarily on role-playing games.

Career
Greg Benage worked for Biohazard Games, publishers of Blue Planet (1997). Fantasy Flight Games arranged to publish a new edition of Jeff Barber's and Benage's Blue Planet, and as part of the arrangement FFG wanted one of the Biohazard team to come over to Fantasy Flight; Benage agreed, and FFG spent 2000 pushing out an entirely new line of Blue Planet products. Since the original mechanics of the game had never been very polished, Benage decided to rewrite them entirely, which resulted in a brand new "Synergy" system. Benage assisted lead designer Rob Vaughn on FFG's Fireborn.

Benage has written novels in the Eldernost fantasy series.

References

External links
 Home page
 

21st-century American male writers
21st-century American novelists
American fantasy writers
American male novelists
Living people
Role-playing game designers
Year of birth missing (living people)